The 13th Orgburo of the Russian Communist Party (Bolsheviks) was elected by the 1st Plenary Session of the 13th Central Committee, in the immediate aftermath of the 13th Congress.

Full members

Candidate members

Members of the Orgburo of the Central Committee of the Communist Party of the Soviet Union
1924 establishments in the Soviet Union
1926 disestablishments in the Soviet Union